Biddeford Saco Old Orchard Beach Transit, or BSOOB Transit, is the primary provider of public transportation in the Tri-Town area of Maine, just south of Portland. It operates a system of fixed bus routes in Biddeford, Saco, Scarborough and Old Orchard Beach, an express commuter bus service that connects the Tri-Town area to downtown Portland, and seasonal trolleys that serve tourist destinations in the area. Many of the system's routes connect to the agency's hub at the Saco Transportation Center, which opened in 2019. Along with the Greater Portland Metro Bus and the South Portland Bus Service, BSOOB Transit accepts fares electronically via the DiriGO TouchPass system.

Routes
BSOOB Transit operates seven routes in total, including five local bus routes, one commuter route, and a seasonal tourist trolley:

  Orange-Black Line: Loop route in Biddeford that connects the Saco Transportation Center to Biddeford Crossing and back.

  White-Blue Line: Loop route that runs from the Saco Transportation Center to Old Orchard Beach to Scarborough, and then returns to Saco via Old Orchard Beach.

 Maroon Line: Loop route that connects the Saco Transportation Center to Scarborough and back.

 Green Line: Local bus route that runs from the Saco Transportation Center to Downtown Portland, via Scarborough and South Portland.

 ZOOM Express: Commuter service that provides peak-hour weekday service between Biddeford and Downtown Portland. The line makes three stops outside of Portland, at the Biddeford Park & Ride adjacent to Maine Turnpike exit 32, at the Saco Park & Ride adjacent to exit 36, and at the Saco Transportation Center.

 Yellow Line: Local bus route that runs from Biddeford to the University of New England. Transportation is free to all students with valid ID. The purpose of the route is to connect local and off-campus students with the university and to give commuters free parking, which is available at the Jefferson Street lot in Biddeford and the Saco train station.

Old Orchard Beach Trolley: Summer-only tourist trolley that shuttles visitors around Old Orchard Beach. Termini are at Splashdown USA water park and the Pinehurst Campground.

Fleet
Biddeford Saco Old Orchard Beach Transit owns a fleet of 24 buses, including a number of tourist trolleys that run on the Old Orchard Beach Trolley route and two Prevost X3-45 coaches that operate on the ZOOM Express route.

External links
BSOOB Transit website

References

Biddeford, Maine
Bus transportation in Maine
Transportation in York County, Maine